Nothoploca endoi is a moth of the family Drepanidae described by Yoshimotho in 1983. It is found in Taiwan.

References

Moths described in 1983
Thyatirinae
Moths of Taiwan